The Corpus Christi Tournament was a golf tournament on the LPGA Tour, played only in 1952. It was played in Corpus Christi, Texas. Betty Jameson won the event.

References

Former LPGA Tour events
Golf in Texas
Sports in Corpus Christi, Texas
Women's sports in Texas